The Indianapolis 500 has been broadcast on network television in the United States since 1965. From 1965 to 2018, the event was broadcast by ABC, making it the second-longest-running relationship between an individual sporting event and television network, surpassed only by CBS Sports' relationship with the Masters Tournament (since 1956). In 2014, ABC celebrated fifty years televising the Indianapolis 500, not including 1961 through 1964 when reports and highlights of time trials were aired on ABC's Wide World of Sports. Since 2019, the race has aired on NBC.

From 1965 to 1970, ABC televised a combination of filmed and/or taped recorded highlights of the race the following weekend on Wide World of Sports. The 1965 and 1966 presentations were in black-and-white, while all subsequent presentations have been in color. From 1971 to 1985, the Indianapolis 500 was shown on a same-day tape delay basis. Races were edited to a two- or three-hour broadcast, and shown in prime time. Starting in 1986, the race has been shown live in "flag-to-flag" coverage. In the Indianapolis market, as well as other parts of Indiana, the live telecast is blacked out and shown tape delayed to encourage live attendance. For 2016, the race was completely sold out, and as such the local blackout was lifted for that year. Since 2007, the race has been aired in high definition.

Currently, the television voice of the Indy 500 is Leigh Diffey, who has been working the race since NBC took over in 2019. The last television voice of the Indy 500 for ABC was Allen Bestwick, who held the position from 2014 to 2018.  Past television anchors include Chris Schenkel, Jim McKay, Keith Jackson, Jim Lampley, Paul Page, Bob Jenkins, Todd Harris, and Marty Reid. Other longtime fixtures of the broadcast include Jack Arute, Sam Posey, Jackie Stewart, Bobby Unser, and Jerry Punch.

On August 10, 2011, ABC extended their exclusive contract to carry the Indianapolis 500 through 2018. Starting in 2014, the contract also includes live coverage of the IndyCar Grand Prix on the road course.

In 2019, the Indianapolis 500 moved to NBC, as part of a new three-year contract that unifies the IndyCar Series' television rights with NBC Sports (the parent division of IndyCar's current cable partner NBCSN), and replaces the separate package of five races broadcast by ABC. The Indianapolis 500 is one of eight races televised by NBC as part of the new deal, which ended ABC's 54-year tenure as broadcaster of the event. WTHR is the local broadcaster of the race under this contract; the existing blackout policy is expected to continue should the race not sell out. As no spectators were allowed for the 2020 Indianapolis 500, the race was aired live in the Indianapolis market.

Live coverage

NBC era

Dillon Welch is the first second-generation broadcaster to be involved in the race telecast. His father Vince worked the race in the ABC era until 2014.

ABC era

Starting in 1986, the race was shown live in its entirety. The 1986 race, however, was postponed for six days due to rain.
From 2007 to 2018, live coverage was produced by ESPN. Also in 2007, Rusty Wallace and Jamie Little worked the 500, but did not cover any other races that season.
Rupert Boneham once worked as part of the ABC Sports production crew at Indy.

ABC-TV live telecast gallery

Same-day tape delay coverage
From 1971 to 1985, the Indianapolis 500 was shown on a same-day tape delay basis. Races were edited down to a between two and three hour broadcast, and shown in prime time. It was also blacked out in the Indianapolis market until a later date. The broadcasts would typically open with the rendition of "Back Home Again in Indiana", and the starting command, but no other pre-race ceremonies. In addition, the broadcast was supplemented with some pre-recorded, in-depth featurettes, aired during down times. Later telecasts included live introductions at the top and bottom of the broadcast, with the closing segment sometimes an interview with the race winner, which by that time, had been revealed to the viewers. During this period, the announcers' commentary at both the start and finish of the race were recorded as those events transpired. However, the commentary of the middle parts of the race was semi-scripted, and recorded in post-production, and edited into the broadcast as it was being aired.

In 1973, Jackie Stewart was scheduled to be the color commentator. The race however, was red flagged on Monday due to the Salt Walther crash, and rain delayed the start until Wednesday. Stewart was unable to stay for the race running on Wednesday since he was due to compete the following weekend as a driver in the Grand Prix of Monaco, so Chris Economaki took his place.
In 1971 Chris Schenkel was supposed to be the telecast host, but was injured when the pace car crashed coming into the pits at the start of the race.
In 1971, a young David Letterman, who then worked at ABC's then-Indianapolis affiliate WLWI-TV, was one of the roving turn reporters.

Wide World of Sports & closed-circuit coverage
Race commentary for ABC's Wide World of Sports broadcasts was recorded during post-production. During the actual running of the race, anchor Jim McKay occasionally served as a roving reporter, recording interviews in the pits and garage area, which was later edited into the broadcast. In some years the broadcast also included highlights of time trials. From 1964 to 1970, the Indianapolis 500 was shown live on closed-circuit television in theaters and other similar venues across the United States. All live closed circuit broadcasts were anchored by Charlie Brockman.

Local live coverage
The Indianapolis 500 was first broadcast on television from 1949 to 1950 on WFBM (now WRTV) in Indianapolis. It was done to boost sales of television sets. At the time, there was consideration for the race to be broadcast nationally by 1951 or 1952, possibly through a network syndication arrangement originating through WFBM. After two years, however, the Speedway management decided to eliminate live television coverage, fearful that live local television coverage would hurt gate attendance. Likewise, the cost to expand the broadcast nationally was considered prohibitive. For 1951, WFBM-TV was permitted to televise time trials live, but not the race itself. In future years, local live coverage of time trials would continue in various forms, but the race itself was to be blacked out in the Indianapolis area. Only twice (2016 and 2021) would the local blackout be lifted on race day.

Time trials and practice
ABC carried highlights of time trials for the first time in 1961. ABC continued to cover time trials exclusively through the 1970s and early 1980s. In 1987 ESPN began covering portions of time trials. From 1987 to 2008, time trials was aired over a combination of ABC, ESPN, and ESPN2, in varying levels of air time. From 2009 to 2013, time trials was aired on Versus/NBCSN. Time trials returned to ABC in 2014-2018. NBC and NBCSN have aired time trials since 2019.

In 1993, ESPN began covering daily practice session, with a wrap-up show each afternoon. The "Indy Live Daily Reports" continued through 2006, and in some years were packaged as part of RPM 2Night or SportsCenter. Since 2009, Carb Day has been aired by Versus/NBCSN. Live streaming of practice began in 2001. Streaming providers have included: Indy500.com official site (2001, 2004), Yahoo! (2002-2003 & 2006), WhiteBoxPC/NeuLion (2009), YouTube (2010-2018), NBC Sports Gold (2019-2020) and Peacock Premium (2021).

Footnotes

See also
Indianapolis Motor Speedway Radio Network
Indianapolis 500 in film and media

References

Works cited
Daytona 500 Indy 500 Live
Johnson's Indy 500 - Indy on TV
Fang's Bites: The Indy 500 On ABC
Indianapolis 500 numbers game. 
Record Low Ratings For Indianapolis 500

 Indianapolis 500
Broadcasters
Indianapolis 500 broadcasters
Indianapolis 500 broadcasters
Indianapolis 500 broadcasters
Indianapolis 500 broadcasters
NBC Sports